The 2016 conference on Sunni Islam in Grozny was convened to define the term "Ahl al-Sunnah wa al-Jama'ah", i.e. who are "the people of Sunnah and majority Muslim community", and oppose Takfiri groups. The conference was held in the Chechen Republic capital of Grozny from 25 to 27 August 2016, sponsored by the president of Chechnya, Ramzan Kadyrov, and attended by approximately 200 Muslim scholars from 30 countries, especially from Russia, Egypt, Syria, Libya, Kuwait, Sudan, Jordan, etc. at the invitation of Yemeni Sufi preacher, Ali al-Jifri.

The conference was dedicated to the 65th anniversary of the birth of Kadyrov's father, Akhmad Kadyrov, the first President of Chechnya.

The conference was notable for excluding representatives of Wahhabi and Salafi movements, and for its definition of Sunni Muslims in the final communiqué of the conference that included Sufis, Ash'aris and Maturidis, but not Wahhabis or Salafis. It condemned Salafism and Wahhabism as "misguided" sects, along with extremist groups such as ISIS, Hizb ut-Tahrir, the Muslim Brotherhood and others.

The conference definition stated:
“Ahl al-Sunnah wa al-Jama'ah are the Ash'aris and Maturidis (adherents of the theological systems of Imam Abu Mansur al-Maturidi and Imam Abu al-Hasan al-Ash'ari). In matters of belief, they are followers of any of the four schools of thought (Hanafi, Maliki, Shafi’i or Hanbali) and are also the followers of the Sufism of Imam Junaid al-Baghdadi in doctrines, manners and [spiritual] purification."

Participants
Over 200 Muslim scholars-theologians and religious leaders from various Islamic schools of thought from 30 countries all over the world, including Egypt, Syria, Lebanon, Jordan, Yemen, Morocco, Libya, Kuwait, Sudan, Qatar, Iraq, India, Indonesia, Britain, Russia, South Africa, Uzbekistan, and Azerbaijan.

Among the notable scholars and preachers in attendance were:
 Ahmed el-Tayeb (Grand Imam of Al-Azhar)
 Shawki Allam (Grand Mufti of Egypt)
 Ali Gomaa (former Grand Mufti of Egypt)
 Ibrahim Salah al-Hudhud (president of al-Azhar University)
 Abdel-Hadi al-Qasabi (chairman of the Supreme Council of Sufi Orders in Egypt)
 Usamah al-Azhari (Egypt)
Sheikh Abubakr Ahmad, Grand Mufti of India
 Shaikh Anwar Ahmad al Baghdadi 
 Muḥammad Muneeb-ur-Rehman, Grand Mufti of Pakistan
 Ahmad Badreddin Hassoun (Grand Mufti of Syria)
 Abdel-Fattah al-Bezm (Grand Mufti of Damascus)
 Tawfiq Ramadan al-Bouti, the son of Sheikh Mohamed Said Ramadan Al-Bouti (Syria)
 Salah Mezhiev (Grand Mufti of Chechnya)
 Kamil Samigullin (Grand Mufti of Tatarstan)
 Allahshukur Pashazade (Grand Mufti of Caucasus)
 Abdul Karim Khasawneh (Grand Mufti of Jordan)
 Sa'id Foudah (A Leading Contemporary Kalam Scholar from Jordan)
 Umar bin Hafiz (Yemen)
 Ali al-Jifri (Yemen)
 Saif al-Asri (Yemen)
 Ahmed Abbadi (Secretary-General of the Mohammedia League of Moroccan Ulama)
 Idris al-Fassi al-Fahri (Morocco)
 Muhammad Abdul Ghaffar al-Sharif (Kuwait)
 Hatim al-Awni (Saudi Arabia)

Recommendations of the Conference
The conference participants reflected their support for what in Russia is considered “traditional” Islam. Some suggestions came out of the conference, including recommendations to:

 The establishment of a TV channel in Russia to counter Al-Jazeera, and "convey to people a truthful message of Islam and fight against extremism and terrorism."
 The establishment of "a scientific centre in Chechnya to monitor and study contemporary groups... and refute and scientifically criticise extremist thought." The proposed name for the centre is Tabsir (clairvoyance).
 The "return to the schools of great knowledge", such as: (Al-Azhar in Egypt, al-Qarawiyyin in Morocco, and al-Zaytuna in Tunisia, and the Hadramout in Yemen), excluding Saudi religious institutions, particularly the Islamic University of Madinah.
 Scholarships would be provided for those who are interested in studying sharia to counter Saudi funding in this field.

Criticism
The conference evoked a torrent of condemnation and criticism followed from the Saudi Council of Senior Scholars—as well as from the scholars of the Salafi, Wahhabi, and Ikhwani movements—for what they perceived as Russian meddling in regional politics via religion, and the implied condemnation of Salafis as Kharijites, Karramiyya, or deviants. Twenty-one Sunni religious institutions across the world signed a petition of support to Salafis, expressing solidarity with them and called for unity, emphasizing that the conference participants only represent themselves. Syrian Sufi scholar Hasan al-Dugim condemned the conference as a sham and defended the "Salafi brothers"; arguing that they are closer to Sufis than "Putin's scholars". The conference was also discerned by the noticeable absence of delegates from Turkey.

The International Association of Muslim Scholars, an organization led by Muslim Brotherhood-linked Islamist Yusuf al-Qaradawi, reportedly criticized the conference as "a shameful attempt to sow dissent within the Muslim community." The conference has also been widely criticised for toeing a Russian government line. Prominent Russian religious leaders avoided the conference in protest. The chairman of the Spiritual Administration of Muslims of Moscow, Ildar Alyautdinov, expressed his disillusionment with the resolution of the conference.

In response to the widespread criticism received in the Islamic World, Al-Azhar publicly distanced itself from the conference and in mid-October sent a high-level delegation led by the senior Azhari scholar, Shaykh Abbas Shouman to Saudi Arabia and reconciled with the Salafi religious establishment, including the Grand Mufti Abdul Azeez Aal-Shaykh.

See also

 2020 International Maturidi Conference
 Amman Message
 International Islamic Unity Conference (Iran)
 Al-Azhar Shia Fatwa
 A Common Word Between Us and You
 List of Ash'aris and Maturidis
 Kalam
 Wahhabi War
 Nejd Expedition
 Hadith of Najd

References

Notes

Citations

External links
 Official Website
 Download Concluding Statement in English
 Grozny Conference: The First International Conference Dedicated To Answering The Question: Who Are The Sunnis?
 Sunni Muslims Distance Themselves From Radical Salafist Muslims 
 Storm in a Teacup: A Statement on the Chechnya Conference
 Chechen Mufti Defends Fatwa That Calls Followers Of Nontraditional Islam 'Extremists'

2016 in Russia
2016 conferences
2016 in Islam
Islamic conferences
Fatwas
Open letters
Sunni Islam
History of Islam
Islam and society
Asharis
Maturidis
Sufism
Wahhabism
Salafi movement
Muslim Brotherhood
Grozny
Ramzan Kadyrov
August 2016 events in Russia